Robert Saltby (fl. 1383–1386), of Lincoln, was an English landowner, mayor and Member of Parliament.

He was a Member (MP) of the Parliament of England for Lincoln in 1383 and 1386. He also served as Mayor of Lincoln for 1383–84.

He married Joan, the widow of Alexander Herlley of Lincoln and had at least one son.

References

 

Year of birth missing
Year of death missing
English MPs February 1383
Members of the Parliament of England (pre-1707) for Lincoln
Mayors of Lincoln, England
English MPs 1386